Melaleuca huegelii, commonly known as chenille honey-myrtle, is a plant in the myrtle family, Myrtaceae and is endemic to the south-west coastal areas of Western Australia.

Description

The flowers are white, cream-coloured or a shade of pink and arranged in spikes on the ends of branches which continue to grow after flowering and sometimes also in the upper leaf axils. The stamens are arranged in bundles of five around the flower, with 6 to 13 stamens in each bundle.

Taxonomy and naming
Melaleuca huegelii was first formally described in 1837 by Stephan Endlicher in Enumeratio plantarum quas in Novae Hollandiae ora austro-occidentali ad fluvium Cygnorum et in sinu Regis Georgii collegit Carolus Liber Baro de Hügel. The specific epithet (huegelii) refers to Carl von Huegel, collector of the type specimen, who found the species growing at Fremantle in 1833.

There are two subspecies:
Melaleuca huegelii  Endl. subsp. huegelii  occurs from the Walkaway district to the Augusta district in the Geraldton Sandplains, Jarrah Forest, Swan Coastal Plain and Warren biogeographic regions;
Melaleuca huegelii subsp. pristicensis Barlow occurs in the Shark Bay district in the Yalgoo biogeographical region. The name pristicensis is from the Ancient Greek pristis meaning "shark" in reference to the distribution of the subspecies.

Distribution and habitat
Melaleuca huegelii occurs along the coast of Western Australia from the Shark Bay district to the Augusta district. It occurs in coastal areas on limestone cliffs, dunes and plains.

Conservation status
This species is classified as "not threatened" by the Government of Western Australia Department of Parks and Wildlife although the subspecies pristicensis is classified as "Priority Three" meaning that it is poorly known and known from only a few locations but is not under imminent threat.

References

huegelii
Myrtales of Australia
Rosids of Western Australia
Plants described in 1837
Endemic flora of Western Australia